Giulio Marzi (11 September 1647 – February 1718) was a Roman Catholic prelate who served as Auxiliary Bishop of Ostia-Velletri (1693–1718) and Titular Bishop of Heliopolis in Augustamnica  (1693–1718).

Biography
Marzi was born in Tivoli, Italy on 11 September 1647.
On 22 December 1693, he was appointed during the papacy of Pope Innocent XII as Auxiliary Bishop of Ostia-Velletri and Titular Bishop of Heliopolis in Augustamnica.
On 27 December 1693, he was consecrated bishop by Galeazzo Marescotti, Cardinal-Priest of Santi Quirico e Giulitta, with Filippo Tani, Bishop of Città Ducale, and Giovanni Battista Visconti Aicardi, Bishop of Novara, serving as co-consecrators. 
He served as Auxiliary Bishop of Ostia-Velletri until his death in February 1718.

References 

17th-century Italian Roman Catholic bishops
18th-century Italian Roman Catholic bishops
Bishops appointed by Pope Innocent XII
1647 births
1718 deaths